The Siege of Minas Tirith is a 1975 board wargame published by Fact and Fantasy Games.

Gameplay
The Siege of Minas Tirith is a game in which both the Battle of Pelennor Fields and the siege of Minas Tirith are depicted.

Publication history
According to Shannon Appelcline, in 1975 TSR "started distributing other publishers' games — a pretty common tactic at the time, as the hobbyist industry was pretty fractured. They advertised their first distributed items in The Strategic Review #3 (Autumn 1975): a set of three fantasy board games. To be precise, they were three fantasy board games based on the writings of J.R.R. Tolkien: Fact and Fantasy's The Battle of Helm's Deep (1974), Fact and Fantasy's The Siege of Minas Tirith (1975), and LORE's Battle of the Five Armies (1975)."

Reception
Larry Pound reviewed Siege of Minas Tirith in The Space Gamer No. 3. Pound commented that "All in all, the Siege of Minas Tirith is a good game and is faithful to the trilogy. The rules allow replication of the events of the trilogy without forcing the outcome."

Reviews
Panzerfaust and Campaign Number 72 Mar-Apr 1976

References

Board games based on Middle-earth
Board games introduced in 1975
Fact and Fantasy Games games